Muhammad Adil Iqbal (born 9 July 1992) is a Pakistani footballer who plays as a midfielder for Hawkescity F.C of National Premier Leagues NSW in Australia and the Pakistan national team. A right-footed player, he usually plays as central midfielder. Earlier in his career he primarily played as a wide midfielder. Adil is known for his dribbling skills, speed, crossing ability and his accurate right foot long-range shots from the centre of midfield.

Adil first came to prominence with Pak Elektron, signing a professional contract for the club at the age of 18 - scoring six goals in 25 appearances in his first season. The following season he signed for Khan Research Laboratories, where he went on to win three Pakistan Premier League titles, two Challenge Cup titles and finishing runners-up in 2013 AFC President's Cup. Three years later Adil's signature was pursued by a leading Kyrgyzstani club, and after protracted transfer negotiations he joined Dordoi Bishkek in 2014. Adil played a major role in helping the team win a treble; the league title, league cup and super cup, scoring four goals and making six assists in the league.

Adil received his first international cap in a 2–1 defeat against Palestine. He has earned over 20 caps for the national team since his debut in 2011, playing in the 2012 and 2014 AFC Challenge Cup qualification tournaments, and the 2018 FIFA World Cup qualifiers.

Career

Pak Elektron & Khan Research Laboratories

Early years
Pak Elektron placed Adil in their first team for the 2010 season, signing his first professional contract at the age of 18. Adil went on to score six goals in 25 appearances, making a lot of assists, in all competitions. His performances and record made Khan Research Laboratories, the runners-up of the league, caught their attention to sign him permanently. The following season, Adil won the Pakistan Premier League with Khan Research Laboratories in 2011 as KRL set a Pakistan Premier League record scoring the most points in a season in the Pakistan Premier League with 77 points. Adil also won the Challenge Cup with KRL (1–0) against rivals K-Electric in 2011. Later, Adil went on to make his debut AFC President's Cup on 8 May 2012 in a 0–0 draw against Erchim from Mongolia.

2012–2013 season

During the 2012 season, Adil played an important in the first-team under then manager Tariq Lutfi, who replaced Sajjad Mahmood the previous season; Adil established himself as a key player in the midfield and guided the team to clinch  a historic double; winning the league title, the domestic cup and qualified for the AFC President's Cup for the following season – finishing runners-up in the competition losing (1–0) to Turkmenistan's Balkan. Adil scored his first goal in the continental competition in the 77th minute in a 2–0 group stage victory over Philippine's Global and later scoring the second goal in a 2–0 win over Hilal Al-Quds from Palestine in the final group stage. He helped KRL to reach the final, which they eventually lost. In 2013 season, Adil won his third and last league title with the Rawalpindi side.

During his three years stint at Khan Research Laboratories, Adil scored a total of 24 goals in 65 matches in all competitions before signing for Kyrgyzstani club FC Dordoi Bishkek, managed by former Pakistan national team coach Zaviša Milosavljević, in 2014.

Dordoi Bishkek

2014–15 season

Adil completed his move to FC Dordoi Bishkek in 2014, joining his former club and Pakistan national team player Kaleemullah Khan, after successful performances in 2013 AFC President's Cup, on an initial one-year contract. Since his arrival in Dordoi, he has helped the club win their pre-season tour friendly matches in Turkey and Russia. He played a major role in helping the team win a treble; the league title, league cup and super cup, scoring four goals and six assists in 13 appearances in the league.

Adil made his AFC Cup debut on 9 February 2015 in a 1–0 defeat against Turkmenistan side Ahal in the preliminary round. In an interview with Dawn News, it was reported that Adil has got an offer from football club of Eerste Divisie in Netherlands and that "he will travel to Netherlands in May 2015 to attend the trial to show them his skills".

International career

Adil started his international youth career in 2006 being part of the under-14 Pakistan team in the AFC U-14 Football Festival held in Bangladesh. Apart from the under-14 team, Adil also represented the under-17, under-19, under-21, and the Pakistan under-23 national sides. Whilst with the under-23 team, Adil also represented Pakistan in the Asian Games and South Asian Games, scoring his first goal in the 54th minute in a 2-2 draw against Palestine in Al-Nakba International Football Cup 2012. Adil earned his first senior cap for Pakistan in a 2–1 defeat against Palestine on 1 March 2011.

2012 AFC Challenge Cup qualifiers
Adil was called up for the squad for the 2012 AFC Challenge Cup qualification matches against India, Turkmenistan and Chinese Taipei in March 2011.

Personal life

Adil was born in Bahawalpur, Punjab and was a fruit and sugarcane seller, going around the streets of Bahwalpur with his cart, to financially support his family. However, he used to play football whenever he found the time and thus was scouted when he got selected for the regional team in the National U-14 Championship held in 2006. He eventually impressed the coaches to secure a call-up for the Pakistan U-14 side that took part in AFC Festival of Football in Bangladesh.

Adil has described the Argentina national team player Carlos Tevez as his ideal football star and has been compared with Brazilian footballer Roberto Carlos for his quick pace and composure by the local media in Pakistan. He is considered one of the best footballers in South Asia alongside fellow Pakistani Kaleemullah Khan, Sunil Chetri from India and Ali Ashfaq from Maldives.

In an interview with Football Pakistan, Adil said that he enjoys eating the national dish of Kyrgyzstan, Pilaf, which is a particular favourite of his, and he also enjoys grabbing a slice of pizza or two when possible.

Career statistics

Club

1.Includes statistics from AFC Cup and AFC President's Cup.
2.Includes statistics from Challenge Cup, Kyrgyzstan Super Cup, Ala-Too Cup, and Legend Cup.

International

International goals

Scores and results table list Pakistan's goal tally first.

Honours

Club
Khan Research Laboratories
 Pakistan Premier League: 2011, 2012, 2013; Runner-up: 2010
 Challenge Cup: 2010, 2011, 2012
 AFC President's Cup: Runner Up: 2013

Dordoi Bishkek
Shoro Top League: 2014
Kyrgyzstan Cup: 2014
Kyrgyzstan Super Cup: 2014
Ala-Too Cup: 2015

Country
Pakistan
M.R Cup Sri Lanka: Runners-up: 2012
Philippine Peace Cup: Third Place: 2013

References

External links

 Pakistan national team profile
 
 

1992 births
Living people
Footballers from Bahawalpur
Pakistani footballers
Pakistani expatriate footballers
Association football midfielders
Pakistan international footballers
Expatriate footballers in Kyrgyzstan
Pakistani expatriate sportspeople in Kyrgyzstan
FC Dordoi Bishkek players
Footballers at the 2010 Asian Games
Khan Research Laboratories F.C. players
Asian Games competitors for Pakistan
Expatriate soccer players in Australia
Pakistani expatriates in Australia